Angelica Panganiban  (born Angelica Jane David Charlson on November 4, 1986) is a Filipino-American actress, model, TV host and comedienne.

Regarded as the new “Queen of Drama” by various media outlets, Panganiban is recognized as one of the most seasoned and versatile actresses in the Philippines. She has won 3 FAMAS Awards, 2 Cinema One Originals Digital Film Awards and the title of "Best Comedy Actress" for nine years in a row at the PMPC Star Awards and Golden Screen TV Awards, thanks to her exceptional comical talent. Additionally, at the age of 28, she is one of the youngest recipients of the renowned 'Bert Marcelo Lifetime Achievement Award' from the Guillermo Mendoza Memorial Scholarship Foundation for her substantial contributions to Philippine industry.

Panganiban started her career at the age of 6 when she appeared in the TV show, Love Note. Her first regular show was the 1990s youth-oriented variety show, Ang TV on ABS-CBN. She made her first movie role, in Carlo J. Caparas’ Antipolo Massacre.  She also starred in films like Separada, Sarah... Ang Munting Prinsesa, Ama, Ina, Anak and earned Best Child Actress awards and nominations in the FAMAS Awards and PMPC Star Awards. She played teeny-bopper roles in G-mik and Berks.

In 2004, she transitioned to mature actress status in the movie, Santa Santita and gained Best Actress nominations in the Film Academy of the Philippines or FAP Luna Awards, FAMAS Awards, and ENPRESS Golden Screen Awards. She is also known for her dramatic performances in the movie, A Love Story and television series, Iisa Pa Lamang and Rubi wherein she received Best Actress and Best Supporting Actress awards and nominations in the Film Academy of the Philippines or FAP Luna Awards, ENPRESS Golden Screen Awards, and PMPC Star Awards. She also starred in horror films like: White Lady, Bulong, and Segunda Mano where she was recognized as Best Supporting Actress in the FAMAS Awards. In 2011, she earned Best Performance by an Actress in a Leading Role (Musical or Comedy) award in the 8th ENPRESS Golden Screen Awards for Movies  and Comedy Actress of the Year award in the 42nd Guillermo Mendoza Memorial Scholarship Foundation for her role in Here Comes The Bride. She also won several Best Comedy Actress awards and nominations in the ENPRESS Golden Screen and PMPC Star Awards for the gag show, Banana Split.

Panganiban experienced a second peak in her career after starring in the film, That Thing Called Tadhana which earned her commercial and critical success, notably the Best Actress honor from the 2014 Cinema One Originals Film Festival and the 13th Gawad Tanglaw Awards. She received an Achievement in Acting nomination in the 2015 Guam International Film Festival for the said movie as well. She was also tapped to portray the iconic role of Madam Claudia Buenavista in the remake of Pangako Sa ’Yo.

Early life
Angelica Jane David Charlson was born in Payatas, Quezon City on November 4, 1986. Her biological mother was a Filipina who died in 2008 and was buried in Singapore, while her biological father, Mark David Charlson, is an American from Iowa and a former member of the US Navy. She acquired the surname Panganiban from her adoptive family.

Panganiban finished elementary school in 1999 at St. Vincent School in Teacher's Village, Quezon City, and high school in 2003 at the same school's Main campus along West Avenue. She was the Junior-Senior Prom Princess in 2002 and Miss Junior and Senior Prom in 2003. She was also a cheerleader and a Feature Editor in their school newspaper. She attended college at Thames International Business School, majoring in mass communication.

Career

Early work (1992–2003)
As a child star, Panganiban received Best Child Actress awards and nominations because of her outstanding performances in movies. Her notable appearances include Jenny in the 1993 Maricel Soriano drama movie, Separada where she won two Best Child Actress awards in the FAMAS and PMPC Star Awards; and Becky in the 1995 family-drama film, Sarah... Ang Munting Prinsesa  with her friend, Camille Prats in the title role where she received Best Child Actress nominations. She also appeared in a daily drama series, Familia Zaragoza.

As a teen star, Panganiban starred in the youth-oriented show, G-mik in 1999 and she was paired with Carlo Aquino. In 2001, Panganiban played the role of Paula Villamines in the drama series, Sa Puso Ko Iingatan Ka which was top-billed by Judy Ann Santos. In 2002, she portrayed the role, Nicole in another youth-oriented show entitled, Berks along with her love team partner, Carlo Aquino.

Her team up with Carlo Aquino continued. She appeared as the girlfriend of Aquino's character in the hit comedy film, Ang Tanging Ina top-billed by Ai-Ai de las Alas in 2003. Up until the third installment of Regal Entertainment's Mano Po, the movie Mano Po III: My Love in 2004, wherein she played as the young Vilma Santos and Aquino as the young Christopher de Leon.

Breakthrough (2004–2012)
In November 2004, at the age of 18, after portraying several supporting roles, she landed the lead and the title role in the movie, Santa Santita opposite Jericho Rosales. The director of the film, Laurice Guillen and the producer, Tony Gloria of Unitel Pictures requested Johnny Manahan of ABS-CBN Talent Center to audition his talents for the role. "We auditioned 30 of them," Guillen said. "Some of them had played supporting roles in films already. But we couldn't find what we were looking for among them. Then one day, Angelica Panganiban came to audition. And we found in her the actress we wanted." Her performance in that film earned her three Best Actress nominations in the FAMAS, FAP Luna, and ENPRESS Golden Screen Awards. Eventually in the same year, she played a lead role in the soap opera, Mangarap Ka with Piolo Pascual. In 2005, she starred in drama series, Vietnam Rose with Maricel Soriano.
	
During 2006, she appeared regularly in Your Song,  Komiks, and Love Spell; she also topbilled the horror suspense film, White Lady. In 2007, she starred in a fantasy series, Rounin and played the role of Aura. In the same year, Panganiban appeared in the film, A Love Story with Aga Muhlach and Maricel Soriano from which she earned her first Best Supporting Actress trophy in the FAP Luna Awards. She also appeared in Judy Ann Santos' romantic soap opera, Ysabella as a guest character, and in December 2007, she played Lena in Maging Sino Ka Man: Ang Pagbabalik with Derek Ramsay, Toni Gonzaga, and the original cast: John Lloyd Cruz, Bea Alonzo, Sam Milby, and Anne Curtis. She became a full-fledged adult dramatic actress in the 2008 primetime drama series, Iisa Pa Lamang with Claudine Barretto. That series made her the Villain of the Year in the 1st Supreme to the Extreme Awards (Philippine Star), and she earned Best Drama Actress nomination in the 23rd PMPC Star Awards for Television.

In October 2008, Panganiban pioneered a comedy gag show, Banana Split on ABS-CBN. The show also featured Valerie Concepcion, Roxanne Guinoo, Dianne Medina, and Cristine Reyes. She's the only actress who remained from the original cast when the show started its second season in 2009 until its last airing in 2020.

In February 2009, Panganiban  appeared in an episode of Your Song with Derek Ramsay, and in mid-2009 she filmed her television series, Rubi which was based on the 2004 Mexican telenovela Rubí and the pilot episode aired in February 2010. She was joined by Diether Ocampo, Shaina Magdayao, and Jake Cuenca. Charlson received Best Actress in a Daily Soap Opera award in the 7th USTv Students' Choice Awards through that series. Later that year, she also starred in the drama/romance movie, I Love You, Goodbye with her then-boyfriend Derek Ramsay. This was rated the Second Best Picture in the 2009 Metro Manila Film Festival and made her a box-office favorite after it won awards for Best Picture, Best Screenplay, Best Story and Best Director. Charlson was nominated for Best Festival Actress. In the same year, she also received Best Comedy Actress nomination in the PMPC Star Awards for Television through Banana Split.

The following year, Panganiban starred in Here Comes The Bride, a 2010 comedy film with Eugene Domingo, Tuesday Vargas, Jaime Fabregas, Tom Rodriguez, and John Lapus. The movie gained positive reviews from viewers and critics and enjoyed box office success. Charlson won the Best Performance by an Actress in a Leading Role (Musical or Comedy) award in the 8th ENPRESS Golden Screen Awards for Movies. Because of this film, Charlson was hailed as the Comedy Actress of the Year in the 42nd Guillermo Mendoza Memorial Scholarship Foundation. She also won as the Best Comedy Actress through Banana Split in the 24th PMPC Star Awards for Television.

Panganiban topbilled a horror-comedy film, Bulong together with Vhong Navarro in February 2011. It was Star Cinema's opening salvo for that year and was directed by Chito Rono. She also consistently demonstrated her comedic antics onscreen through Banana Split as she earned another Best Comedy Actress nomination in the 25th PMPC Star Awards for Television, and won the Outstanding Performance by an Actress in a Gag or Comedy Program award in the ENPRESS Golden Screen Awards.

Panganiban proved her versatility when she received her second Best Supporting Actress award through the horror suspense film, Segunda Mano in the 60th FAMAS Awards. The movie also starred Kris Aquino and Dingdong Dantes. It was an official entry in the 2011 Metro Manila Film Festival of Star Cinema with the AgostoDos Pictures, and MJM Productions.

In 2012, Panganiban starred in four different films: Every Breath U Take, a romantic comedy film opposite fellow Star Magic artist, Piolo Pascual; Madaling Araw Mahabang Gabi, an Indie film that was written and directed by friend, Dante Nico Garcia; 24/7 in Love, a romantic comedy film that starred an ensemble cast of selected Star Magic talents in celebration of its 20th anniversary; and the romantic drama film, One More Try which was an official entry in the 2012 Metro Manila Film Festival by Star Cinema, with Dingdong Dantes, Zanjoe Marudo, and Angel Locsin.

Recent roles (2013–present)
February 11, 2013 marked her comeback in Philippine Primetime via television drama, Apoy Sa Dagat alongside Piolo Pascual and Diether Ocampo. It was Panganiban's first time to play a dual role in the series and first in the history of Philippine TV to have billed the lead star twice.

Also, aside from her weekend Banana Split, a version of the gag show entitled, Banana Nite aired at weeknights after Bandila  which she top-billed together with fellow Banana Split stars: John Prats, Zanjoe Marudo, Jason Gainza, Pooh, Melai Cantiveros, Ryan Bang, Alex Gonzaga, Boom Labrusca, Jef Gaitan, and Kean Cipriano as additions.

In 2014, Panganiban top-billed a comedy-satire film, Beauty in a Bottle with Angeline Quinto and Assunta de Rossi. She starred in a romantic comedy film entitled That Thing Called Tadhana opposite JM De Guzman. This was one of the entries in the 2014 Cinema One Originals Film Festival where Panganiban was hailed as Best Actress for two consecutive years. She also received an Achievement in Acting nomination in the 2015 Guam International Film Festival for her exceptional performance as Mace Castillo in the said movie.

Panganiban played the iconic character of Madam Claudia Buenavista, originally portrayed by Jean Garcia, in the 2015 remake of Pangako Sa ’Yo.

In late 2015, as Banana Nite ended its two-year run, her gag show, Banana Split which celebrated its 7th Anniversary was renamed into Banana Sundae and took a new timeslot. Additions to the group were: JC De Vera, Jessy Mendiola, Jobert Austria, and Pokwang.

Continuously showcasing her versatility in acting, Panganiban garnered Best Drama Actress and Best Comedy Actress nominations in the 29th PMPC Star Awards for Television for Pangako Sa ’Yo and Banana Split, respectively.

On July 17, 2020, it was announced that Panganiban is joining the series on the upcoming Kapamilya Channel's Walang Hanggang Paalam, after Julia Montes and Nadine Lustre are backed out.

She also announced that Walang Hanggang Paalam will be her last drama show as she will retire from teleseryes but clarified that she would not leave ABS-CBN and acting altogether.

Advocacies and issues 
Panganiban has been outspoken on numerous political issues in the Philippines, including the government's response to the COVID-19 pandemic in the Philippines, and the ABS-CBN franchise renewal controversy.

Personal life
In a tell-all interview with The Buzz, Panganiban disclosed that her biological mother died in 2008 and was interred in Singapore. She added that she did everything to find her biological father, Mark Charlson, who she said did not try to find her because he thought that she and her mother had died in a car accident. In November 2010, she was reunited with Charlson in Los Angeles, California after 24 years apart, when ABS-CBN gave her a week-long break from work.

Her daughter, Amila Sabine Homan, was born on September 20, 2022.

Filmography

Film

Television

Awards and nominations

Film

Television

Special awards and recognitions

Box office

Rankings

References

External links
 

1986 births
Ateneo de Manila University alumni
Filipino child actresses
Filipino television actresses
Filipino people of American descent
Filipino people of Norwegian descent
Living people
Star Magic
People from Quezon City
Actresses from Metro Manila
Filipino women comedians
20th-century Filipino actresses
21st-century Filipino actresses
ABS-CBN personalities
Filipino adoptees